In public transport, Route 17 may refer to:

Route 17 (MTA Maryland), a bus route in Baltimore, Maryland and its suburbs
London Buses route 17

17